George McGrath (19 September 1885 – 6 August 1956) was a British field hockey player. He won a gold medal at the 1920 Summer Olympics in Antwerp. He played for the Wimbledon Hockey Club.

References

External links
 

1885 births
1956 deaths
British male field hockey players
Olympic field hockey players of Great Britain
Field hockey players at the 1920 Summer Olympics
Olympic gold medallists for Great Britain
Olympic medalists in field hockey
Medalists at the 1920 Summer Olympics